Matteo Mancini (died 1505) was a Roman Catholic prelate who served as Bishop of Sora (1503–1505).

Biography
On 7 June 1503, Matteo Mancini was appointed during the papacy of Pope Julius II as Bishop of Sora. He served as Bishop of Sora until his death in 1505.

References

External links and additional sources
 (for Chronology of Bishops) 
 (for Chronology of Bishops) 

16th-century Italian Roman Catholic bishops
1505 deaths
Bishops appointed by Pope Julius II